Jean-Thomas Taschereau (December 12, 1814 – November 9, 1893) was a Canadian lawyer and judge.

Born in Quebec City, Lower Canada (now Quebec), the son of 
Jean-Thomas Taschereau, a politician who was a Member of the Quebec National Assembly, and Marie Panet, he was called to the bar in 1836. He studied law in Paris and upon his return to Quebec City where he practised for 18 years. He also taught  at Université Laval from 1855 to 1857. In 1865, he was appointed a judge of the Quebec Superior Court, and in 1873, was appointed to the Court of Queen's Bench of Quebec. On September 30, 1875, he was appointed to the Supreme Court of Canada and retired from the court on October 6, 1878.

He was the father of Louis-Alexandre Taschereau, a Liberal Premier of the Canadian province of Quebec from 1920 to 1936 and Sir Henry-Thomas Taschereau, Chief-Justice of Quebec 1907-1909

References 
 
 Supreme Court of Canada biography
 the Canadian Encyclopedia

1814 births
1893 deaths
Jean-Thomas
Justices of the Supreme Court of Canada
People from Quebec City
French Quebecers
Province of Canada judges